Empire: Original Soundtrack Season 3 is the fourth soundtrack album by the cast of the musical drama television series Empire which airs on Fox. The album includes songs that featured during the third season of the show. It was released on April 28, 2017.

Track listing

References

Empire (2015 TV series)
Television soundtracks
2017 soundtrack albums